The IMOCA 60 class racing yacht Groupe Bel was launched in 2007 to a designed by VPLP and Guillaume Verdier and constructed by Indiana Yachting in Italy.

Racing Results

References 

Individual sailing yachts
2000s sailing yachts
Sailing yachts designed by VPLP
Sailboat type designs by Guillaume Verdier
Sailboat types built in Italy
Vendée Globe boats
IMOCA 60